This is a list of the extreme points of Switzerland.

Elevation

Latitude and longitude

References

See also

Extreme points of Earth
Geography of Switzerland

Geography of Switzerland
Switzerland
Lists of coordinates
Extreme